Valletta is the capital city of Malta.

Valletta may also refer to:

Valletta F.C., a Maltese football club
Valletta Waterfront, a wharf in Floriana, Malta
Bank of Valletta, a Maltese bank
Valletta Treaty, a Council of Europe treaty
Valetta, New Zealand, a locality

People with the surname
Amber Valletta (born 1974), American actress and model
Anthony Valletta (1908–1988), Maltese naturalist
Antonino Valletta (1938–2022), Italian politician
Vittorio Valletta (1883–1967), Italian industrialist

See also
Vickers Valetta, an aeroplane
Alexandra Valetta-Ardisson (born 1976), French politician